Samuel, Sam or Sammy Ellis may refer to:

People 
 Sam Ellis (cricketer) (1870/71–1946), English cricketer
 Sam Ellis (footballer) (born 1946), English footballer
 Sam Ellis (runner) (born 1982), British athlete
 J. Sam Ellis, American politician
 Sammy Ellis (1941–2016), American baseball player
 Samuel Ellis (1733–1794), owner of land in New York Harbor after whom Ellis Island is named
 Samuel Ellis (English cricketer) (1851–1930), English cricketer
 Samuel Ellis (New Zealand cricketer) (1889–1949), Auckland (New Zealand) cricketer
 Samuel Burdon Ellis (1787–1865), British Royal Marines officer
 Sam Ellis (songwriter) (born 1987), songwriter and record producer

Companies 
 Samuel Ellis and Company, British engineering firm

Ellis, Samuel